= Our Lady of the Rosary (Murillo, Madrid) =

Painting by Bartolomé Esteban Murillo

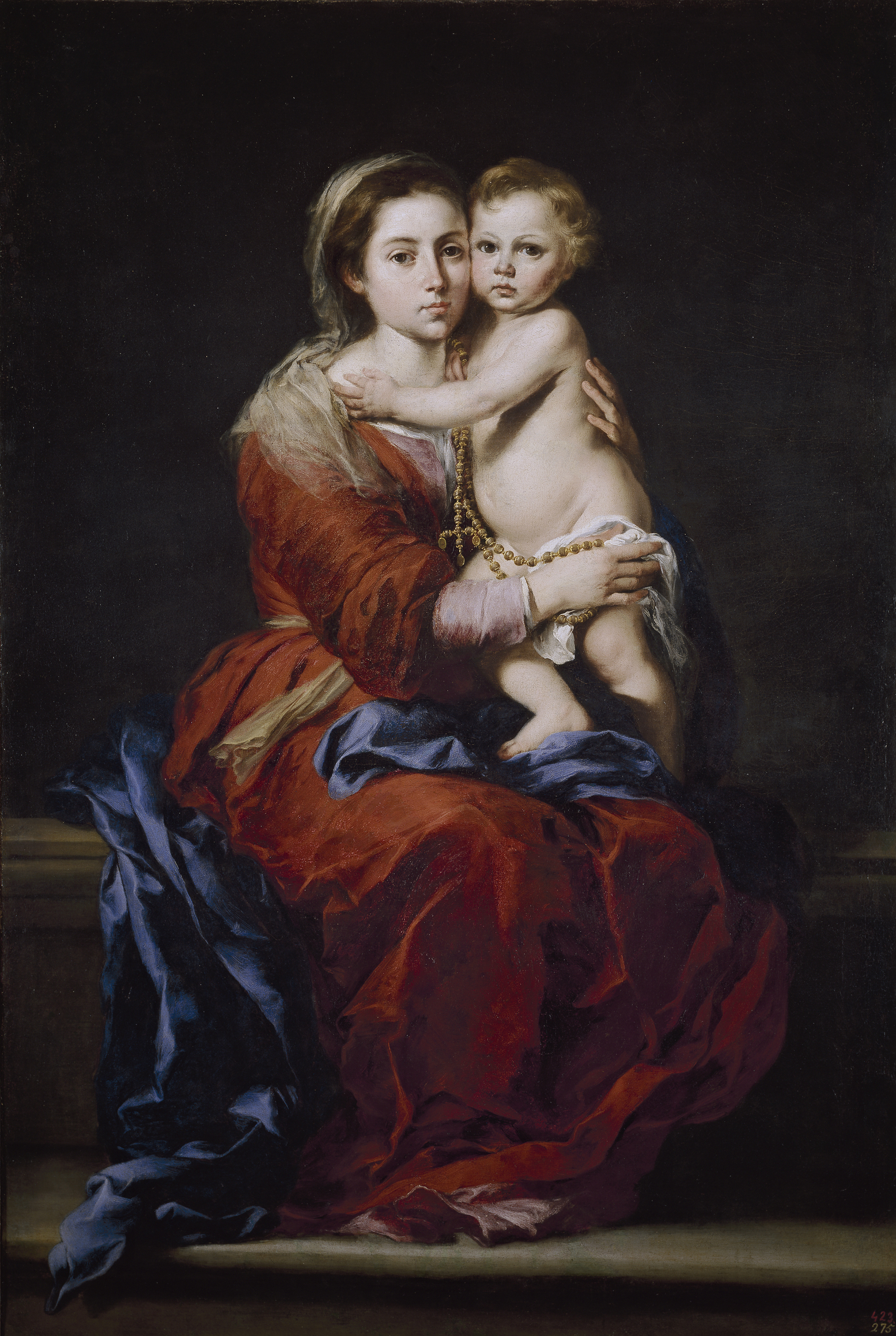
- Artist: Bartolomé Esteban Murillo
- Year: c. 1650 - 1655
- Medium: Oil on canvas
- Dimensions: 112 cm × 166 cm (44 in × 65 in)
- Location: Museo del Prado; Madrid

Our Lady of the Rosary is an oil on canvas painting of Our Lady of the Rosary by Bartolomé Esteban Murillo, created c. 1650-1655. It was previously in the El Escorial Monastery and Palacio Real de Madrid and now is held in the Museo del Prado, in Madrid.

The Virgin Mary sits on a stone bench holding the infant Jesus, who stands with one foot resting on his mother's left leg and the other on the bench. Touching each other's cheeks and through physical connection, these figures display the gentlest and most sincere gestures of love. Together, they gaze at the viewer, an expression of solemn and subtle devotion to the object of their gaze—the devout spectator.

== Bibliography (in Spanish) ==
- García Algarra, Francisco Javier (2002). Entorno histórico. «'La Sagrada Familia del Pajarito' de Bartolomé Esteban Murillo». Programa Doctorado Hª del Arte.
- Hellwig, Karing (2007). «Pintura del siglo XVII en Italia, España y Francia». El Barroco. Arquitectura. Escultura. Pintura. h.f.Ullmann. ISBN 978-3-8331-4659-6.
- Martínez, María José (1992). «Estudio de la obra seleccionada». Murillo. Valencia: Ediciones Rayuela. ISBN 84-7915-082-3.
- Morales Martín, José Luis (1987). Historia Universal del Arte. Barroco y Rococó. Volumen VII. Barcelona: Ed. Planeta. ISBN 84-320-6687-7.
- Mâle, Emile (2002). El arte religioso de la Contrarreforma: Estudios sobre la iconografía del final del s. XVI y de los ss. XVII y XVIII. Encuentro. ISBN 978-84-7490-643-1.
- Valdivieso, Enrique (1992). «Murillo, la realidad y el éxtasis». Murillo. Valencia: Ediciones Rayuela. ISBN 84-7915-082-3.
